Witnesses in Uniform is a program according to which the delegations made of soldiers and veterans of the Israeli Defense Forces, members of the Israel Police and other uniformed services, and family members of the fallen soldiers  are sent to Poland to commemorate the Holocaust and learn about it. It usually includes a Holocaust survivor who tells their story and guides from Yad Vashem. The delegations visit Nazi death camps, as well as  synagogues, cemeteries, memorials, to learn about the pre-war Jewish history, and the historical background to the Nazi's  "Final Solution" to the Jewish question.

The first delegation of this kind was sent to Auschwitz-Birkenau in 2001.

In early 2022 the IDF announced that the program will be moved from Poland to Lithuania, due to the recent crisis in the Israel-Poland relations. Grant Arthur Gochin, American diplomat and researcher on Jewish affairs on Lithuania criticized the solution, alleging that the Lithuanian state is notorious in distorting The Holocaust in Lithuania.

See also
Holocaust tourism

References

Holocaust commemoration
Israel Defense Forces
The Holocaust in Poland
Israel–Poland relations